Roscommon–South Leitrim was a parliamentary constituency represented in Dáil Éireann, the lower house of the Irish parliament or Oireachtas, from 2007 to 2016. The constituency elected 3 deputies (Teachtaí Dála, commonly known as TDs). The method of election was proportional representation by means of the single transferable vote (PR-STV).

History and boundaries
The constituency was created for the 2007 general election by the Electoral (Amendment) Act 2005, which gave effect to the 2004 Constituency Commission Report on Dáil Constituencies. It included all of County Roscommon and the southern portion of County Leitrim (the area to the east and south of Lough Allen). This territory was previously represented through the constituencies of Longford–Roscommon and Sligo–Leitrim, both of which were abolished in 2007.

The Electoral (Amendment) Act 2009 defined the constituency as:

It was abolished at the 2016 general election and replaced by the Roscommon–Galway and Sligo–Leitrim constituencies.

TDs

Elections

2014 by-election

2011 general election

2007 general election

2015 Marriage Equality referendum
On 22 May 2015, Roscommon–South Leitrim was the only constituency to vote against the proposition in what is sometimes described as the marriage equality referendum, with 51.42% voting No.

See also
Dáil constituencies
Politics of the Republic of Ireland
Historic Dáil constituencies
Elections in the Republic of Ireland

References

External links
 Oireachtas Members Database
 Roscommon-South Leitrim

Dáil constituencies in the Republic of Ireland (historic)
Historic constituencies in County Roscommon
Historic constituencies in County Leitrim
2007 establishments in Ireland
Constituencies established in 2007
2016 disestablishments in Ireland
Constituencies disestablished in 2016